The 6th Lithuanian Vanguard Regiment was a military unit of the Grand Duchy of Lithuania. It was also named:

 Tartar Regiment of Jakub Azulewicz, King's Militia
 2nd Regt of Ułan's Court,

History

Great Sejm 1788-1792
The regiment was stationed in Kobryn & Lomna (1792 Dec).

Kościuszko Uprising 
The regiment fought in the Battle of Vilnius.

References 

Military units and formations established in 1776
Cavalry regiments of Lithuania